Bagn Bydesamling  is a small museum located in the hamlet of Dolven, south of Bagn at Sør-Aurdal in Innlandet county Norway. The museum is situated in the traditional district of Valdres and is run as a subsidiary of Valdres Folkemuseum.

History
The museum was founded in 1920 on the  Islandsmoen farm. It includes the farm itself, a saw mill, a flour mill, and other furnished buildings. The museum consisting of 12 log buildings and a building for permanent displays. The collection was donated to the village in 1941 by Olaus Islandsmoen, a local politician and educator. Additionally, the museum has exhibition about composer Sigurd Islandsmoen and an exhibition about the author Mikkjel Fønhus.

The museum contains a preserved farm, a saw with water stream and a neighborhood school with an original interior. The museum has also displays at the small farms Sandviken and Bagnsbergatn. The last one is the site of a Norwegian World War II memorial location. All the items in the museum are original and have been collected from various farms and other locations in the area.  The permanent display consists of artifacts from both the Stone Age and Iron Age, textiles and clothing, furniture and kitchen items, and artifacts from the occupation of Norway by Nazi Germany.

Collection
  Telthuset — regimental arsenal for Ytre Valdreske Kompagni 
   Prestgardsboligen —  priest farm house
  Stabelbygningen — building for tenant farmer living in Perstgarden
  Seterbu — mountain farmhouse 
  Oppgangssag — sawmill 
  Bekkekvern (mølle) —  watermill 
  Stabbur— Storage houses
  Smie —  iron works with blast furnace
  Koie (skogshusvære) — hut (forest shelter) 
  Båtnaust  — boathouse  
  Badstue (korntørke) — sauna for corn drying

Gallery

See also
Bautahaugen Samlinger

References

External links
 Bagn Bygdesamling

Sør-Aurdal
Open-air museums in Norway
Museums in Innlandet